A cagoule (also spelled cagoul, kagoule or kagool), often reduced to cag, is the British English term for a lightweight weatherproof raincoat or anorak with a hood (usually without lining), which often comes in knee-length form. The Canadian English equivalent is windbreaker. The word cagoule is borrowed from the French for balaclava or hood.

In some versions, when rolled up, the hood or cross-chest front pocket doubles as a bag into which the shell can be packed.

History and styles 

A cagoule which could be rolled up into a very compact package and carried in a bag or pocket was patented by former Royal Marine Noel Bibby and launched in the UK under the brand name Peter Storm in the early 1960s.

In 1965, the French cagoule brand K-Way was introduced. 

Original versions were lightweight and packable with generally an integral hood, elastic or drawstring cuffs, and a fastening at the neck. Usually, the cagoule could not open fully at the front and was pulled on over the head.

As a functional outdoor rain-garment, the original styling and proportions allowed the protection of the wearers' small personal items, such rucksack, waist bag and/or camera bag. 

Later copied and marketed as a close-fitting cheap fashion accessory, the style became very popular in the United Kingdom during the 1970s.

Gallery

See also 
 Mackintosh
 Parka

References 

Jackets
1960s fashion
1970s fashion
1980s fashion
1990s fashion
2000s fashion
2010s fashion